Billy Gilman is the eponymous fifth studio album by the country music singer Billy Gilman, released in 2006 through Image Entertainment. "Gonna Find Love" and "Southern Star" were released as singles, although neither charted. The album reached number 55 on the Top Country Albums chart. It was Gilman's final release in the country genre.

Track listing

Personnel

 Monty Lane Allen – backing vocals
 Angela Bacari – backing vocals
 Larry Beaird – acoustic guitar
 Joe Chemay – bass guitar
 J.T. Corenflos – electric guitar
 Eric Darken – percussion
 Larry Franklin – fiddle
 Billy Gilman – lead and backing vocals
 Steve Hornbeak – keyboards, synthesizer strings, background vocals
 Paul Leim – drums
 Chris Leuzinger – electric guitar
 Jimmy Nichols – keyboards
 Kim Parent – backing vocals
 John Wesley Ryles – backing vocals
 Pam Tillis – duet vocals on "Almost Over (Gettin' Over You)"
 Cindy Walker – backing vocals
 Biff Watson – acoustic guitar
 Andrea Zonn – backing vocals

Chart performance

References

2006 albums
Billy Gilman albums
Image Entertainment albums